Sarah Mason (born 19 September 1971) is a British novelist of romance novels since 2002. In 2003, her debut novel Playing James won the Romantic Novel of the Year Award by the Romantic Novelists' Association.

Biography
Sarah Mason was born on 19 September 1971 and she grew up near the sea in Cornwall, England. She obtained a degree in Maths from University of Bristol.

At the age of 25 she began importing gourmet popcorn from United States and selling it to everyone from Sainsbury's to Virgin cinemas and was running a company with a seven figure turnover.

When she married she sold the business on, she decided take a few months off to decide what she wanted to do next, and she started writing.

She lives in Cheltenham, Gloucestershire, with her husband, three children, and a West Highland Terrier.

Bibliography

Colshannon Series
 Playing James (2002)
 High Society (2004) aka Society Girls (US title)

Single novels
 The Party Season (2003) aka Party Girl (US title)
 Sea Fever (2007) aka Fever (US title)

References and sources

1971 births
Place of birth missing (living people)
Living people
English romantic fiction writers
RoNA Award winners
21st-century British novelists
21st-century British women writers
Women romantic fiction writers
British women novelists